Terri Treas is an American actress, writer and director who has starred in films and on television.

She is best known for her role as Cathy Frankel, one of the alien "Newcomers" on the short-lived science fiction television series Alien Nation (1989–1990) and the five subsequent TV movies continuing the storyline.

Early years
Treas was born in Kansas City, Kansas. Her dancing led to a scholarship with the Joffrey Ballet when she was 15 years old.

Career 
Treas began her career on stage, frequently as a dancer in Broadway shows. Broadway productions in which Treas appeared include Working (1978), Dancin''' (1978), Pal Joey (1976), and My Fair Lady (1976).

On television, she appeared in the 1980s series Seven Brides for Seven Brothers as Hannah McFadden from 1982 to 1983, the Fox Network series DEA, and Santa Barbara.

Her first movie role was in the 1979 movie All That Jazz; her other film roles are So Fine (1981), The Best Little Whorehouse in Texas (1982), The Fabulous Baker Boys (1989) and House IV (1992).

In 1992, Treas directed her first movie, Play Nice, starring Louise Robey.

Treas has made guest appearances on many TV shows, such as Knight Rider, Crazy Like a Fox, The A-Team, Murphy Brown, and Roseanne.

As of 2019, Treas was teaching at the Los Angeles Performing Arts Conservatory. She also has taught at The Playground and at the University of Southern California's Masters Writing Program, where she directed that school's One Act Play Showcase.

Personal life
Treas married producer Michael Zand.

 Selected filmography 

 Alien Nation: The Udara Legacy (1997 TV film) – Cathy Frankel
 Alien Nation: The Enemy Within (1996 TV film) – Cathy Frankel
 Alien Nation: Millennium (1996 TV film) – Cathy Frankel
 Ladykiller (1996)
 Scene of the Crime (1996) – Captain Lorraine Hanover
 Alien Nation: Body and Soul (1995 TV film) – Cathy Frankel
 Alien Nation: Dark Horizon (1994 TV film) – Cathy Frankel
 Yankee Zulu (1993) – Rowena
 Little Miss Millions (1993) – Susan Ferris
 Snapdragon (1993) – Co-writer with Gene Church
 House IV (1992)
 Play Nice (1992) – Director
 Rage and Honor (1992) – Rita Carrion
 Frankenstein Unbound (1990) – Voice of Computer
 The Fabulous Baker Boys (1989) – Girl in Bed
 The Terror Within (1989) – Linda
 The Nest (1988) – Dr. Morgan Hubbard
 Deathstalker III (1988) – Camisarde
 Something in Common (1986 TV film) – Nancy Webster
 The Best Little Whorehouse in Texas (1982) – The Chicken Ranch Girl
 So Fine (1981)
 Headin' for Broadway (1980)
 All That Jazz'' (1979)

Treas's Broadway musical credits – "Pal Joey" Circle in the Square, "My Fair Lady" Revival 1976, "Pippin", "Working", "King of Hearts", "Back Country", "Dancin'", "One Night Stand"

References

External links 
 

Living people
Writers from Kansas City, Kansas
American television actresses
American film actresses
American soap opera actresses
Actresses from Kansas City, Kansas
Film directors from Kansas
21st-century American women
Year of birth missing (living people)